Sophronica paupercula is a species of beetle in the family Cerambycidae. It was described by Holzschuh in 2006.

References

Sophronica
Beetles described in 2006